Phelsuma v-nigra, also known as the Indian day gecko or Boettger's day gecko, is a species of gecko. It is endemic to the Comoros.

Subspecies
There are three subspecies:
Phelsuma v-nigra anjouanensis  – Anjouan Island day gecko
Phelsuma v-nigra comoraegrandensis  – Grand Comoro day gecko
Phelsuma v-nigra v-nigra

References

Phelsuma
Endemic fauna of the Comoros
Reptiles of the Comoros
Reptiles described in 1913
Taxa named by Oskar Boettger